Dustan Rural District is a rural district (dehestan) in Badreh District, Darreh Shahr County, Ilam Province, Iran. At the 2006 census, its population was 4,862, in 998 families.  The rural district has 20 villages.

References 

Rural Districts of Ilam Province
Darreh Shahr County